The 2011 Auto GP Series was the second year of the Auto GP, and the thirteenth season of the former Euroseries 3000. The championship began on 14 May at Monza and finished on 4 September at the Circuit Ricardo Tormo in Valencia, after seven double-header rounds.

The series became part of the World Touring Car Championship meetings and received Eurosport coverage. The series also adopted the Formula One points system for the first race of the weekend, with a consequent change in the lower points-awarding second race. The season champion and the top driver under 21 years of age Kevin Ceccon received a GP2 Series test.

Ombra Racing driver Kevin Ceccon claimed the championship title, taking just one victory on Hungaroring with four other podium placings. Luca Filippi who missed Oshersleben's round due to GP2 Series commitments finished season as runner-up with one win at Brno. Sergey Afanasyev missed Donington Park round because of problems with British visa scored three wins at Budapest, Oshersleben and Valencia, more than any other driver in this season. He finished season on the third position in the standings.

Teams and drivers

Calendar
A seven-round calendar was published on 22 November 2010. Six of the seven rounds will support World Touring Car Championship events, with the other event being held as a stand-alone event, with other series in support. On 8 March 2011, the round due to be held in Marrakech was dropped from the calendar, and will be replaced by the Hungaroring. On 23 June 2011, the round scheduled to be held in Bucharest was dropped from the calendar due to financial and track difficulties. It will be replaced by a headline event, with the Italian Formula Three Championship in support, held at Mugello.

Championship standings
 Points for both championships were awarded as follows:

In addition:
 One point will be awarded for Pole position for Race One
 One point will be awarded for fastest lap in each race

Drivers' Championship

Teams' Championship

Under 21 Trophy

References

External links
Official Auto GP site

Auto GP
Auto GP
Auto GP